The Piet Retief Delegation massacre was the 1838 killing of 100 Voortrekkers by the Zulu king Dingane in what is now KwaZulu-Natal, South Africa. The Voortrekkers, led by Piet Retief, migrated into Natal in 1837 and negotiated a land treaty in February 1838 with Dingane. Upon realizing the ramifications of the imposed contract, Dingane betrayed the Voortrekkers, killing the delegation including Retief on 6 February 1838. The land treaty was later found in Retief's possession. It gave the Voortrekkers the land between the Tugela River and Port St. Johns. This event eventually led to the Battle of Blood River and the eventual defeat of Dingane.

Massacre
Despite warnings, Retief left the upper Tugela region, 28 January 1838, in the belief that he could negotiate with Dingane for permanent boundaries for the Natal settlement. He eventually met Dingane in Mgungundlovu. He had gotten the impression that Dingane was willing to negotiate but only if Retief returned cattle to him that was stolen by the Batlokwa chief named Sekonyela. Retief eventually was able to find the cattle and brought back a portion of the herd to Dingane. The deed of cession of the Tugela-Umzimvubu region, although dated 4 February 1838 and written by Jan Gerritze Bantjes, (Retief's secretary), was signed by Dingane on 6 February 1838, with the two sides recording three witnesses each. Dingane invited Retief's party to witness a special performance by his soldiers, whereupon Dingane leaped to his feet and ordered his soldiers to capture Retief's party and their colored servants.

Retief, his son, men, and servants, about 100 people in all were taken to a nearby hillside, Kwa-Matiwane below the Hlomo Amabuto, which means, "mustering of the soldiers". The Zulus killed the entire party by clubbing them and killed Retief last so as to witness the deaths of his comrades. Their bodies were left on the Kwa-Matiwane hillside to be eaten by vultures and scavengers, as was Dingane's custom with his enemies.

Motives

The attack is thought to have been premeditated, and it was unlikely that Dingane was going to concede the land through treaty in the first place since he believed that the land was divinely inherited, despite the agreement. As for the rationale behind his attack, there is no single reason, but a multitude of reasons.

One of the most popular reasons given by historians is that Dingane felt threatened because he had gotten news that Voortrekkers that had recently ousted Mzilikazi from the Transvaal region through conquest. The fact that Retief had sent Dingane letters alluding to the expulsion of Mzilikazi which could easily be interpreted as a veiled threat did not help Dingane as seeing the Voortrekkers as being genuine.

It is likely that he saw Retief and the settlers with him coming into the land as an invasion. He feared that he could possibly share the same fate if he did not take a pre-emptive strike against the Voortrekkers. There was also reports that the Voortrekkers were encircling around the settlement of Mgungundlovu, which was interpreted as being a reconnaissance.

Another reason given is that Dingane's sending Retief and his band out to retrieve the stolen cattle was actually a strategic move to see whether or not Retief could be trusted. According to Dingane's intelligence officers, he did not give back all the cattle that he had gotten from Sekonyela.

A reason cited by a few scholars is that is Dingane was also promised horses and guns, along with the return of his cattle. When Retief returned to give Dingane his cattle, he did not give him any guns or horses. Regardless of which event influenced Dingane to take this action, it is very clear that he grew to distrust the Voortrekkers and the other settlers.

Aftermath

After the Retief massacre, Dingane directed attacks against several unsuspecting Voortrekker encampments including the one at Bloukrans. This plunged the Great Trek into temporary disarray. In total 534 men, women and children were killed in the Weenen massacre.

Retief's death and the Weenen massacre eventually led to the decisive Voortrekker victory at Blood River, after which Andries Pretorius and his "victory commando" recovered the remains of the Retief party. They buried them on 21 December 1838. The twenty-one year old Jan Gerritze Bantjes (1817-1887), Retief's former secretary and now Pretorious' secretary, recorded the battle and the entire December campaign in the "Bantjes Journal".

Recovered was the undamaged deed, "The Cession of Natal" from Retief's leather pouch, also written by Bantjes, and later verified by a member of the "victory commando", E.F. Potgieter. Two exact copies of the deed survive, (either of which could be the original) but legend states the original disappeared in transit to the Netherlands during the Anglo-Boer War (1899-1902). The site of the Retief grave was more or less forgotten until pointed out in 1896 by J.H. Hattingh, a surviving member of Pretorius's commando. A monument recording the names of the members of Retief's delegation was erected near the grave in 1922.

See also

 List of massacres in South Africa

Notes

Conflicts in 1838
February 1838 events
Massacres in 1838
Great Trek
History of KwaZulu-Natal
Military history of South Africa
Massacres in South Africa
1838 in South Africa
1838 murders in Africa